Liis is an Estonian feminine given name and may refer to:
Liis Emajõe (born 1991), footballer
Maarja-Liis Ilus (born 1980), singer
Liis Klaar (born 1938), sociologist and politician
Liis Koger (born 1989), painter and poet
Liis Kullerkann (born 1991), volleyball player
Liis Lass (born 1989), actress 
Liis Lemsalu (born 1992), singer
Liis Lepik (born 1994), footballer
Liis Lindmaa (born 1988), actress
Liis Pello (born 1988), footballer
Nele-Liis Vaiksoo (born 1984), singer and actress
Liis Viira (born 1983), composer, harpist, and animator

References

Estonian feminine given names